A backseat driver (also spelled back-seat driver) is a passenger in a vehicle who is not controlling the vehicle but who excessively comments on the driver's actions and decisions in an attempt to control the vehicle. A backseat driver may be uncomfortable with the skills of the driver, feel out of control since they are not driving the vehicle, or want to tutor the driver while they are at the wheel. Many comment on the speed of the vehicle, or give alternative directions.

Some backseat drivers exhibit this type of behavior simply because they feel the driver is taking risks they would not normally take, while others may have other reasons to be nervous, such as when the driver has a poor driving record. A survey of 2,000 British drivers in early 2018 found that 70% motorists found backseat driving an annoying habit and that life partners were those most likely to interfere. Although only 21% of motorists admitted to backseat driving, half said they have been in arguments due to interfering comments, and five percent admitted to accidentally  jumping a red light during an argument with a backseat driver.

Use of the term extends beyond the literal and into the figurative; a "backseat driver" is someone who offers unsolicited advice, directions, or help in a situation where someone else is doing something.

Examples in context 
The term has been used for technology, such as devices installed in a car which observe the driving through electronic means, and inform the driver or a third party.

The Maine Department of Transportation has a web poster "Are you a Good Back Seat Driver?" asking "True or False: Being a Backseat Driver means it is okay to be noisy or distracting to the driver as long as you are giving them safety tips." The  Inland Register produced by the Roman Catholic Diocese of Spokane makes use of it in a sermon: "Even our phrase 'back-seat driver' reflects this new-found freedom. Which of us who has graduated to the status of driver enjoys a passenger, especially one out of reach in the back seat, who seems to know how to drive better than we do?"

The Art of being a Backseat Driver in the San Bernardino County Sun summarizes various comments of the sort otherwise found in multiple blogs. Some are specialized, such as the Back Seat Driving blog, formerly the "LA Car Blog".

Appearances in culture

The term is used in Backseat Drivers from Beyond the Stars, an episode of Invader Zim. A poem "The Backseat Driver" by Parick G Hughes appears in the Northern Ireland BBC.

The act of giving instructions to a driver has been used as a humorous idea for a game. In All things Considered on NPR for July 19, 2006, there is an account of a "Back Seat Driver competition in Forest City, Iowa. [...] The event—in which a driver races backward while blindfolded and instructed by the voice of a companion over an intercom—is in its eighth year." It has even been noticed by People's Daily.

In a Mighty Morphin Power Rangers season 3 episode, Master Vile and the Metallic Armor, showed Rito being a backseat driver. He asks Master Vile "Are We There yet?" and annoyed him. Rito gets yelled at by him for the whining and not letting him work in peace. Master Vile threaten to turn the Space Skull around and send him back to Rita and Zedd if he doesn't behave himself.

A couple of episodes in Power Rangers Zeo shows example of backseat drivers with Rita Repulsa and Goldar in the motorhome base they share with Lord Zedd, Finster, and Rito. On their way back to the palace, Rita's constant demanding lands the base a flat tire, which she and Zedd blame each other. After getting the tire fixed and back driving, Goldar shows up with the map that Zedd needs and unintentionally proceeds to be another backseat driver by overly trying to help them with the map that lands the motorhome base with yet another flat tire. Surely, Rita and Zedd blames him for the mess. Another example of a backseat driver is Rito whose constant asking of "Are We There Yet?", irritated both Zedd and Rita to the point they threaten to kick him out of the motorhome and make him walk the rest of the way to their campsite if he doesn't behave himself. In Rangers from Two Worlds, Goldar and Rito became back-seat drivers. They squabbled and fought over seating arrangements and veered the motorhome off course and foiling Rita's attempt to turn Katherine back into Catastrophe and instead turned her purse into a monster.

James Bond in Tomorrow Never Dies is forced to dive into the rear seat of his BMW 750il and drive it from a cellular phone that can remotely control the car. Later in the film, both he and Wai Lin are handcuffed together and must jointly ride a motorcycle while constantly bickering.

The earlier episodes of The Simpsons shows examples of backseat drivers in the form of Bart and Lisa annoying Homer to no end with their asking of "Are we there yet?", causing him to snap at them. One time in the season 2 episode "Oh Brother, Where Art Thou?", while driving to Detroit to visit Herb Powell, Marge lost her patience with Bart and Lisa being backseat drivers.

Related idioms 

Armchair quarterback refers to a sports fan who thinks that he or she knows better than the players themselves and is always eager to shout advice, whether live at the game or, more commonly, sitting at home in a chair (hence "armchair"). Similarly, the phrase armchair general is used to refer to somebody who is not in the military but thinks that he or she knows better than the generals who plan military operations.  This term can be used in many of the same situations as backseat driver. In Italy, the term umarell refers to men of retirement age who pass time watching roadworks, offering unwanted advice, similar to a "sidewalk superintendent" in English.

References

External links 

English-language idioms
Driving